Mussaendopsis is a genus of flowering plants belonging to the family Rubiaceae.

Its native range is Malesia.

Species
Species:

Mussaendopsis beccariana 
Mussaendopsis celebica 
Mussaendopsis malayana

References

Dialypetalantheae
Rubiaceae genera